Henry Coppée (October 13, 1821 – March 22, 1895) was an American educator and author.

Biography
Henry Coppée was born in Savannah, Georgia, to a family of French extraction that had formerly settled in Haiti. He studied at Yale University for two years, worked as a civil engineer, and finally graduated from the West Point in 1845. He served in the Mexican–American War as a lieutenant and was brevetted captain for gallantry at the battles of Contreras and Churubusco. During the American Civil War, he edited the United States Service Magazine.

Coppée was Assistant Professor of French at West Point from 1848 to 1849, and then Principal Assistant Professor of Geography, History, and Ethics from 1850 to 1855. After resigning from the army, he was the Professor of English literature and History at the University of Pennsylvania from 1855 to 1866. In 1856, Coppée was elected to the American Philosophical Society. He was selected by Asa Packer as the first president of Lehigh University, an office he filled from 1866 to 1875. He also served as the university's president pro tempore twice: for a few months following the resignation of Lehigh's second President John M. Leavitt (1880), and again, at the passing of Robert A. Lamberton in September 1893 to his own death in Bethlehem, Pennsylvania on March 22, 1895.

Lehigh University's Coppee Hall (built in 1883) was named for him; it was first a gymnasium, later the home of the Department of Arts and Science, and now is home to the Journalism and Communication program. During Coppée's tenure, much building was done on the new campus. A Moravian church on Packer Avenue was remodeled into Christmas Hall, a house for the president was erected, and Packer Hall, the university center, was built. Coppée lectured in history, logic, rhetoric, political economy and Shakespeare.

Selected works
 Elements of Logic; Designed as a Manual of Instruction (Philadelphia: E.H. Butler & Co., 1858)
 Elements of Rhetoric; Designed as a Manual of Instruction (Philadelphia: E.H. Butler & Co., 1859)
 Gallery of Famous English and American Poets (Philadelphia: E.H. Butler & Co., 1859)
 A Gallery of Distinguished English and American Female Poets (Philadelphia: E.H. Butler & Co., 1860)
 The Field Manual for Battalion Drill (Philadelphia: J.B. Lippincott & Co., 1862)
 Grant and His Campaigns: A Military Biography (New York: Charles B. Richardson, 1866)
 Elements of Logic; Designed as a Manual of Instruction, Revised Edition (New York: American Book Company, 1872)
 A History of the Civil War in America (Philadelphia: Porter and Coates, 1875)
 History of the Conquest of Spain by the Arab-Moors (Boston: Little, Brown, & Company, 1881)
 General Thomas (New York: D. Appleton & Co., 1893)

Notes

References

External links

 
  
 Henry Coppée Letters. Available online through Lehigh University's I Remain: A Digital Archive of Letters, Manuscripts, and Ephemera.

1821 births
1895 deaths
American male writers
Yale University alumni
University of Pennsylvania faculty
Presidents of Lehigh University
American military personnel of the Mexican–American War
Members of the Aztec Club of 1847
American people of French descent
Writers from Savannah, Georgia